The 76 mm gun model 1900, also called 76 mm Putilov M1900 gun, was a light quick-firing field gun of the Imperial Russian Army used in the Russo-Japanese War, World War I, Russian Civil War and a number of interwar armed conflicts with participants from the former Russian Empire (Soviet Union, Poland and Finland).

History

The M1900 has been developed in 1900 by engineers of the Putilov Plants. Since 1898 the Imperial Russian Army was looking for a new field-gun and Krupp, Shamona and Schneider sent in their designs. The decision was made in favor for the M1900 and it became the first Russian gun with a recoil system and at the same time the first Russian 76.2-millimetre field gun.

The guns were manufactured in the St. Petersburg Plants.

Employment
The M1900 saw the first action in the Russo-Japanese War and was superior to its Japanese counterpart, the Type 31 75 mm Field Gun and in particular, the Type 31 75 mm Mountain Gun, in regards of the rate of fire and range. The Japanese knew about this disadvantage and compensated this with numerical superiority.

The gun saw further deployment during World War I. Though technically obsolete a number of M1900, however, appeared in the first part of the war to replace heavy losses the Russian Army suffered in the opening battles of 1914, but as soon as the successor of the M1900, the 76 mm divisional gun M1902, were available, they were  withdrawn.

In the Russian Civil War in 1917/18 the M1900 were used by both parties.

Soon after the new Red Army sold or handed over some of the M1900 to some of the new Baltic States and such nations under Soviet influence such as Finland. Poland also received some of the guns and converted the original 76.2-mm (3-in) to 75-mm (2.95-in) caliber to match their existing artillery which consisted of French-made Canon de 75.

In 1918 there was a total of 21 76 mm gun M1900-pieces in Finland.

Specifications
The gun has an upper and a lower gun-carriage. The upper gun-carriage slides, resting on grooves along the rail of the lower gun-carriage. In the trail is an oil buffer, acting as a recoil brake, which includes 40 india-rubber doughnuts which were compressed when the gun was fired. After the recoil stroke the doughnuts expanded again and the barrel returned into firing position.

The barrel is reinforced with a thermal sleeve.

The breech-block equipped with a so-called French turn breech-block with a turn bar, the first one on a Russian gun. The recoil system of the gun did not turn out to be sufficiently effective and that is why the number of manufactured guns remained low.

 Calibre:              76.2 mm
 Length of barrel:     31.4 cal
 Weight of projectile: 6.4 kg
 Muzzle velocity:      590 m/s
 Maximum range:        6.7 km
 Elevation:            −6° to +11°
 Traverse:  ± 2.5°
 Weight (in firing position): ca. 1,000 kg (2,200 lbs)

Gallery

External links 
 Landships II, 76.2mm Putilov M1900 Field Gun

References

Field guns
Artillery of the Russian Empire
76 mm artillery
World War I artillery of Russia
Russo-Japanese war weapons of Russia
Kirov Plant products